Live is the second live album from Shawn Colvin. It was released on Nonesuch Records on June 23, 2009.
|= Recorded July 28–30, 2008 Yoshi's San Francisco

Track listing
"Polaroids"
"A Matter of Minutes"
"Shotgun Down the Avalanche"
"Twilight" (Robbie Robertson)
"Trouble"
"Tennessee"
"Nothing Like You"
"Sunny Came Home"
"Fill Me Up"
"Wichita Skyline"
"I'm Gone"
"Ricochet in Time"
"Diamond in the Rough"
"Crazy" (Gnarls Barkley)
"This Must Be the Place (Naïve Melody)" (Talking Heads)

References

2009 albums
Shawn Colvin albums
Nonesuch Records live albums
Live albums by American artists